Ravelry is a free social networking service and website that beta-launched in May 2007. It functions as an organizational tool for a variety of fiber arts, including knitting, crocheting, spinning and weaving. Members share projects, ideas, and their collection of yarn, fiber and tools via various components of the site.

Development
Spouses Cassidy and Jessica Forbes founded Ravelry in May 2007. Their idea was to create a web presence for all fiber artists.

Ravelry has been mentioned by Tim Bray as one "of the world’s more successful deployments of Ruby on Rails technologies."

As of March 2020, Ravelry had almost 9 million registered users, and approximately 1 million monthly active users.

Features

"Ravelry has become the Internet tool to help the typical needle-wielder navigate through the woolly wild."

Information in Ravelry is organized within a series of tabs. Some customization is available within the tabs (i.e. the ability to re-sort information contained in a tab, create sub-tabs, or change the level of detail displayed). The site was in beta through early 2010, and new features and enhancements are still added frequently. Often these features and enhancements are driven by the community.

These many features are broken down by Maria Hellstrom into three capability spaces: labor, social, and marketplace.

Labor Space
The labor space includes the capabilities which directly support making and documenting fiber arts projects. Capabilities such as the user "Projects" album and pattern "Queue" are tools for personal organization.  Ravelry patterns can be added to a logged-in user's "Favorites," "Queue," or "Projects" pages, indicating that user's interest in, stated desire to make, or progress into the pattern, respectively; a user can additionally record their fiber-related tools ("Needles & Hooks") and available yarn ("Stash") with which to complete these projects.

Ravelry also includes a searchable community-edited yarn and pattern database where users share information and project photos. The database was created by encouraging people to share their projects and information.

Social Space
For social networking, the site has forums, groups, and friend-related features that give people ways to interact with other knitters, crocheters, weavers and spinners. Photos can be added to project and stash pages, and also to forum posts, by connecting to the user's own Flickr or Photobucket or Picasa or Instagram account or by uploading a photo directly from the user's computer or iPhone.

Ravelry and other handcraft-based social networks are unique among social networks in that "[i]t is not adequate to state that one is a knitter or crocheter – one must prove it through acts of labour and documentation." Social capital on Ravelry is "accumulated through extensive cataloguing of handmade items"  and "is textually accessible through the way members interact with each other using articulated and manoeuvrable links (often in the concrete form of hyperlinks) to other members." 

This social capital can be used by craft learners to find answers to questions that they may not know the jargon to describe.  By supporting the open browsing, modification, and re-mixing of patterns and projects in a social way, Ravelry can be considered a "virtual guild" which "rel[ies] on open access to specialized knowledge."

In addition to the structured organizational tools described above, Ravelry has forums which support many social activities such as knit-alongs, charity drives, and games such as "Sock Wars":

Marketplace Space
In addition to serving as an organizational tool and a social network, Ravelry facilitates micro-business, allowing designers to sell their knitting patterns and supporting informal, direct buying and selling between users via the "Stash" and "Needles & Hooks" capabilities.  "Yarnies" are semi-professional dyers, spinners, and/or painters who sell handspun, hand-dyed or painted yarns. Yarnies exist in a separate category from users who are simply selling yarn they own but did not make themselves, and must create a special business-type profile on the site, "blur[ring] the lines between a commercial operation and a homemade undertaking."  Knitters may use Ravelry to fund-raise for charities, an example of "an activity that straddles the commercial and the non-commercial economies," and the site has been also used by some for market research.

Ravelry itself generates income to maintain the site through three main mechanisms. First, advertisements for a range of fiber arts-related products from both large- and small-scale businesses are displayed throughout the site. Second, the pattern store enables designers to sell PDF versions of their patterns; a small portion of the sales from the pattern stores goes to Ravelry, while 98.7% goes to the designers. Third, the Ravelry Mini-Mart sells branded merchandise such as logo T-shirts, bags, and stickers.

Controversies

2019 ban of support for Donald Trump
On June 23, 2019, Ravelry announced via a blog post that it would ban expressions of support of U.S. president Donald Trump and his administration; after Joe Biden's inauguration, the statement was updated to clarify that "this policy is in effect in perpetuity".  The reason given was an incompatibility of Ravelry's policy of inclusiveness with the Trump administration's "support for open white supremacy", with co-founder Cassidy Forbes saying that "it became clear that there wasn’t going to be any allowing some Trump stuff and not allowing other stuff. It wasn’t going to be possible." The details of the policy were adapted from a similar policy established by tabletop role-playing community RPGnet in October 2018. For a time, the site suffered from trolls signing up for accounts in order to spam threads with anti-Ravelry and pro-Trump sentiment and some conservative users left the site as a result, with some others being banned from the site.

Redesign
In June 2020, Ravelry implemented a site redesign which drew significant complaint from users who stated that the new layout triggered a variety of neurological symptoms, including photosensitive epilepsy, migraines, and vertigo. After analyzing the issue, Robert Bartholomew — a medical sociologist and an expert in mass hysteria, but not in web accessibility — published a blog post on Psychology Today describing Ravelry as "an ordinary website" with "no flashing lights or obvious features that should cause health issues", and concluded that the user complaints were most likely the result of "mass suggestion and the redefinition of various ailments as Ravelry-related".  Likewise, digital accessibility specialist David Gibson said that while most websites are doing "terribly" with accessibility, Ravelry "doesn’t seem unusually bad".  The Epilepsy Foundation of America, however, noted that visual patterns such as stripes of contrasting colors could trigger a seizure, and specifically mentioned Ravelry as a potential issue. Ravelry's response to complaints was characterized as dismissive and drew further criticism, including for closing discussion on the user forums and on their Facebook page, for being slow to respond, and for replies from co-founder Cassidy on Twitter and email, which her wife Jessica subsequently disclaimed as "not reflect[ing] the opinions and professional intentions of the Ravelry team".

References

External links
 

2007 establishments in Massachusetts
Internet properties established in 2007
American social networking websites
Knitting
DIY culture
Mass media-related controversies in the United States